is a manga series by Shūhō Satō which was serialized by Shogakukan in Weekly Young Sunday from 1998 to 2001. Yōichi Komori is credited with the original idea for the series, and he also did the research to make the series more authentic.

The series focuses on Daisuke Senzaki, an officer in the Japan Coast Guard, and tells the stories of shipwreck rescues and other incidents where the coast guard plays a role. The plotlines in the series were drawn from incidents and accidents which actually happened while the manga was being written (similar to the "ripped from the headlines" tagline used by various Law & Order series).

The manga has been adapted into two NHK high-definition specials, four films, and one drama series.

Media

Manga

Adaptations

Umizaru (2004)

Umizaru Evolution (2005)

Title: 海猿

Title (romaji): Umizaru

Also known as: Umizaru Evolution / Sea Monkey

Format: Renzoku

Genre: Action, human drama, romance

Episodes: 11

Viewership ratings: 13.1

Broadcast network: Fuji TV

Broadcast period: 2005-Jul-05 to 2005-Sep-13

Air time: Tuesday 21:00

Theme song: Ocean by B'z

Synopsis:

A story of friendship, love and the brutal training of 14 Japan Coast Guard officers becoming rescuer divers. The rescuer divers, on the front line in rescue activities in heavy seas and always one step away from death, are a group of specialists in a profession that only 1% of all Coast Guard officers qualify for. In order to receive that qualification they have to undergo 50 days of grueling training in rescue activities. The young Coast Guard officers, including Daisuke Senzaki, take on the challenge of that hellish training. The story concentrates on the lives of the divers after having passed their examination.

Cast:

 Ito Hideaki as Senzaki Daisuke
 Kato Ai as Izawa Kanna
 Nakamura Toru as Ikezawa Masaki
 Sato Ryuta as Yoshioka Tetsuya
 Sato Hitomi as Komori Chika
 Suzuki Kazuma as Fuyushiba Kosuke
 Natsuyagi Isao as Katsuda Kotaro
 Iida Kisuke as Miike Kenji
 Sakamoto Akira as Iwamatsu Daigo
 Hirayama Usuke as Yamaji Takumi
 Miyake Hiroki as Bessho Kenjiroh
 Usuda Asami as Hoshino Rei
 Ichiki Ami Ono Yui
 Okunuki Kaoru Ono Eriko
 Yoshimoto Miyoko as Ikezawa Naoko
 Masuoka Toru as Tsuda Shinpei
 Ibu Masato as Higo Daisaku
 Tokito Saburo as Shimokawa Iwao
 Sakamoto Makoto as Nagashima Kenta
 Ito Atsushi (ep1)
 Karina (ep1)
 Aoki Munetaka (ep1)
 Namioka Kazuki as Tokunaga Masaya (ep4)
 Fuse Hiroshi
 Suzuki Honoka
 Tanaka Tetsushi
 Yashiba Toshihiro
 Abe Ryohei

Production Credits:

 Screenwriter: Fukuda Yasushi
 Producer: Sekiguchi Shizuo (関口静夫), Suzuki Shintaro (鈴木伸太郎), Hashimoto Hasumi (橋本芙美)
 Director: Hasumi Eiichiro (羽住英一郎), Kobayashi Yoshinori, Usui Hirotsugu
 Music: Sato Naoki

Limit of Love: Umizaru (2006)

The Last Message: Umizaru (2010)

Brave Hearts: Umizaru (2012)

External links

 
1998 manga
Japanese drama television series
Shogakukan manga
Seinen manga